Nicholas of Strasburg was an Alsatian mystic of the Dominican Order from Strasbourg (Strassburg), active in the first half of the 14th century. He was appointed visitator of the German province of the Dominicans by Pope John XXII and took over as inquisitor in the process against Master Eckhart, acquitting him. His major literary work, Summa Philosophiae, is designed as an introduction to philosophical problems for those studying for the Order. Nicholas' manual was written with the aim of establishing a Thomistic approach, which in the early 14th century in Germany meant going up against the alternative philosophical culture represented by Deitrich of Freiberg and Meister Eckhart.

References

14th-century Roman Catholics
14th-century French writers
14th-century German writers
14th-century Christian mystics
Writers from Strasbourg
Roman Catholic mystics
Inquisitors